Guangzhou Metro is the metro system that serves the city of Guangzhou in Guangdong Province of the People's Republic of China. It is operated by the state-owned Guangzhou Metro Corporation and was the fourth metro system to be built in mainland China. Having delivered 1.99 billion rides in 2013, it is one of the busiest metro systems in the world.

The current Guangzhou Metro system consists of fourteen lines:

 Line 1 (Guangzhou East Railway Station–Xilang)
 Line 2 (Jiahewanggang–Guangzhou South Railway Station)
 Line 3 (Tianhe Coach Terminal/Airport North–Panyu Square)
 Line 4 (Huangcun–Nansha Passenger Port)
 Line 5 (Jiaokou–Wenchong)
 Line 6 (Xunfenggang–Xiangxue)
 Line 7 (Meidi Dadao–Higher Education Mega Center South)
 Line 8 (Jiaoxin–Wanshengwei)
 Line 9 (Fei'eling–Gaozeng)
 Line 13 (Yuzhu–Xinsha)
 Line 14 (Jiahewanggang–Dongfeng/Xinhe–Zhenlong)
 Line 18 (Xiancun–Wanqingsha)
 Line 21 (Yuancun–Zengcheng Square)
 Line 22 (Chentougang–Panyu Square)
 Guangfo Line (Xincheng Dong–Lijiao)
 APM (Linhexi–Canton Tower)

Below is a list of Guangzhou Metro stations in operation sorted by lines.

Line 1

Line 2

Line 3

Line 4

Line 5

Line 6

Line 7

Line 8

Line 9

Line 13

Line 14

Line 18

Line 21

Line 22

Guangfo Line

APM

Notes

References

External links
 
 

Guangzhou Metro
Guangzhou
Gua